Ciro Alfredo Gálvez Herrera (born 16 January 1949 in Surcubamba, Tayacaja Province, Huancavelica) is a Peruvian lawyer, songwriter, professor of Quechua and politician. As candidate of the Andean Renaissance party, he ran unsuccessfully in the Peruvian presidential elections in 2001 and 2006. He is again running for President in the 2021 general election, this time under the National United Renaissance with Claudio Zolla as his running mate.

Life 
Ciro Gálvez studied law at the National University of San Marcos in Lima and graduated as lawyer. He studied also Quechua at the INSUC Institute (Instituto Superior de Quechua) in Lima. He opened a notary office in Huancayo.

In 1993, Ciro Gálvez founded the Andean Renaissance party (Renacimiento Andino). He ran unsuccessfully for President in 2001 and was running as Andean Renaissance's presidential candidate for the 2006 national election. On April 7, 2006, two days before the election, he withdrew from the race unofficially, expressing his support for Lourdes Flores' candidacy, but without presenting a formal resignation and not affecting the ballot. He subsequently received 0.186% of the vote, coming in 15th place. He also ran unsuccessfully for Governor of Huancavelica in the 2002 and 2006 regional elections.

He again ran for President in the 2021 general election under the National United Renaissance, with a conservative platform declaring to be in opposition to LGBT rights. For the election, his ticket included former pastor and businessman Claudio Zolla as his first running-mate, due to a political accord with the New Peru Liberal Party, a libertarian movement led by Zolla. On March 31, 2021, he became a national trend in the networks due to his participation in the electoral debate, where he presented his proposals in Spanish and Quechua.

On March 14, 2021, a source from his party reported that he was admitted to a clinic after testing positive for COVID-19. 

He is dean of the Notary College of Junín, Quechua professor – he speaks and sings in Chanka Quechua – and legal assessor of several companies. He is lifelong member of the Inter-American Network of Law Firms and former Professor of Civil Rights at the Los Andes Peruvian University.

Some of his songs such as Kutisaq/Volveré (I will return), Pim wañuchiwachkanchik / Quién nos está matando (Who is killing us) and Iskay pishtaku chawpimpi / Entre dos fuegos (Between two fires) have become popular.

References

External links
Ciro Gálvez Home page, songs
Andean Renaissance's site
¿Quiénes Son? Caretas, Edición Nº 1652, 11 de enero de 2001.

Candidates for President of Peru
1949 births
Living people
National University of San Marcos alumni
National United Renaissance politicians
People from Huancavelica Region